Cinematic Music Group is an American record label, management, publishing & touring company distributed by Geffen Records founded in 2007 by Jonny Shipes. Their roster as of 2020 consists of Joey Bada$$, Pro Era, T-Pain, Smoke DZA, Va$htie, Mick Jenkins, G Herbo, Caveman, Public Access TV, Flipp Dinero, and others.

History 

Cinematic Music Group made one of its earliest signings in 2007 with Harlem’s Smoke DZA. That same year, Cinematic signed Sean Kingston whose self-titled debut album included two #1 Billboard singles, including the double platinum "Beautiful Girls."  The album sold in excess of 1,000,000 units. Cinematic’s next signee, West Coast MC Nipsey Hussle, signed to the company in 2010 and was included on XXL’s Annual Freshman List

In 2010, Shipes signed Big K.R.I.T., who that same year released his  mixtape "Krit Wuz Here" KRIT followed up this success with his “Returnof4eva” mixtape in March 2011.  K.R.I.T debuted the #1 hip hop album on the billboard charts with his debut album Live from the Underground.

In 2010 Cinematic added Vashtie Kola, an artist, designer, and DJ to the roster.
and young tastemakers. Musical members of Pro Era include Joey Bada$$, Kirk Knight, Nyck Caution, CJ Fly, Dessy Hinds, A La Sole, Chuck Strangers, Dyemond Lewis and more. After viewing a video of a 16-year-old Joey Bada$$ freestyling on popular hip hop and viral video website WorldstarHipHop.com, Shipes saw his potential. After writing for two years, Bada$$ released his debut mixtape “1999”, receiving critical acclaim from Complex Magazine. Bada$$ & Pro Era have been noted for their lyricism and return to the 90s sound.

In 2013, Shipes expanded the roster of Cinematic and signed indie R&B/electronic duo ASTR. ASTR released their “Varsity” EP in January 2014.  On July 16, 2014, Cinematic Music Group President Jonny Shipes announced the signing of Chicago emcee Mick Jenkins whose "The Water[s]" album was released, and received a rave review from Stereogum. Jenkins finished off 2014 by touring the country (40 plus cities) on The Smoker's Club tour and saw his first headlining tour with Pro Era’s Kirk Knight in early 2015.

On January 20, 2015, Joey Bada$$ released his debut studio album “B4.DA.$$”. The album sold an impressive 56,000 units opening week making it the #1 rap album in the country that week.

On September 1, 2015, Chicago rapper Lil Herb was added to the roster of Cinematic. His album, Ballin' Like I'm Kobe, was released on September 27, 2015.

On February 4, 2016, Cinematic announced the signing of Brooklyn rock band Caveman on February 11 announced the addition of Public Access TV.

Artists

Discography

References 

Hip hop record labels